"Losing California" is a song by Canadian rock band Sloan. It was the first single released from the band's 1999 album, Between the Bridges. The song peaked at #18 on Canada's Rock chart. Sloan performed the song on a 1999 episode of the NBC television program Late Night with Conan O'Brien.

Charts

Weekly charts

References

1999 singles
Sloan (band) songs
1999 songs
Songs written by Patrick Pentland